Active Adults is a 2017 comedy-drama film written by Max and Aaron Fisher-Cohen and directed by Aaron Fisher-Cohen. It stars Lola Kirke, Dominic Chianese, Jonathan Rosen and Joanna Merlin with supporting roles played by Rosie Perez and Ellen Barkin among others.

Premise
A young couple, Malcolm and Lily, fail in their attempt to start their adult lives in New York City and end up moving in with Malcolm's grandparents in their New Jersey "active adult" community, where the grandparents' golden years aren't as golden as Malcolm expected.

Cast
Lola Kirke as Lily
Jonathan Rosen as Malcolm
Dominic Chianese as Bart
Joanna Merlin as Miriam
Rosie Perez as Zoe
Ellen Barkin as Lucy
Scott Cohen as Mick
Merwin Goldsmith as Hirsch
Sondra James as Rose
Audrey Turner as Katrina

References

External links
 
 

American coming-of-age comedy-drama films
2010s coming-of-age comedy-drama films
2010s English-language films
2010s American films